Casa Buonarroti is a museum in Florence, Italy. The building was a property owned by the sculptor Michelangelo, which he left to his nephew, Leonardo Buonarroti. The house was converted into a museum dedicated to the artist by his great nephew, Michelangelo Buonarroti the Younger. Its collections include two of Michelangelo's earliest sculptures, the Madonna of the Stairs and the Battle of the Centaurs. A ten-thousand book library includes the family's archive and some of Michelangelo's letters and drawings. The Galleria is decorated with paintings commissioned by Buonarroti the Younger and created by Artemisia Gentileschi and other early seventeenth-century Italian artists.

History
On March 3, 1508, Michelangelo, who had moved to Rome three years earlier to work on the Tomb of Pope Julius II, bought four adjoining buildings at the corner of via Ghibellina and via Santa Maria (now via Buonarroti), just north of the Basilica di Santa Croce. He acquired another adjacent structure in April 1514. These five buildings were the nucleus of what would later become the Casa Buonarroti. From 1516 to 1525 Michelangelo occupied the two most spacious buildings, renting out the other three; in that period he was working on the façade of the Basilica of San Lorenzo in Florence. In 1525 he moved to another residence, and all five buildings were rented out.

After moving to Rome in 1534, Michelangelo became increasingly obsessed with the idea of having a "honorable home" in Florence, a palace that would represent his own family with dignity. He repeatedly asked his nephew Leonardo (1519-1599) to transform the five buildings at the corner of via Ghibellina and via Santa Maria into a family palace; however Leonardo always showed little interest in the project, committing only to a partial restoration of the complex which was carried out in 1590, 26 years after Michelangelo's death.

The palace was given its present look by one of Leonardo's sons, Michelangelo Buonarroti the Younger (1568–1647), who further expanded the complex by purchasing an adjacent lot. He had the various buildings rearranged into a unified structure; on the piano nobile, he arranged four monumental rooms dedicated to the celebration of his great-uncle and of his family, as well as a Gallery for displaying the works of art in his collection, including Michelangelo's Battle of the Centaurs and Madonna of the Stairs. Michelangelo the Younger commissioned a number of contemporary Italian artists to decorate the interior rooms, including Artemisia Gentileschi, Cecco Bravo, Pietro da Cortona, Jacopo da Empoli, Francesco Furini, Giovanni da San Giovanni, Domenico Passignano, Ottavio Vannini and Jacopo Vignali.

Main works in the collections
Michelangelo
Madonna of the Stairs, c. 1491
Battle of the Centaurs, c. 1492

Artemisia Gentileschi
Allegory of Inclination, 1615-1616

Gallery

See also
 List of single-artist museums

References

External links

 Casa Buonarroti

Michelangelo
Art museums and galleries in Florence
Buonarroti
Sculpture galleries in Italy
Buonarroti